Analog was a Canadian business information television series which aired on CBC Television from 1971 to 1972.

Premise
This series concerned business and economic matters such as stock markets, presented for a general audience. Gordon Jones was its host.

Scheduling
The series aired on Sundays at 1:00 p.m. (Eastern) on a 15-minute time slot from its debut (11 October 1970) until 27 June 1971. From 26 September 1971, it aired as a half-hour series until the final programme aired 25 June 1972.

See also
 Venture

External links
 

CBC Television original programming
1971 Canadian television series debuts
1972 Canadian television series endings